Keo Pnek Somnop Jet is a 2008 Cambodian horror film directed by Thoung Tharith. The film stars veteran actress Dy Saveth, Sarai Sakana, and Thoung Tharith himself.

References
http://www.angkorwat.com/index.php?com=info&wprdtid=39&wid=5316&wpid=KHMMOV248&wcatid=58&wmtypeid=65&wc=0&winst=1&whp=0

Cambodian horror films
2008 films
2008 horror films